KYEC (88.3 FM) is a radio station licensed to serve the community of Doniphan, Missouri. The station is owned by Central Educational Radio, and airs a hot adult contemporary format.

The station was assigned the KYEC call letters by the Federal Communications Commission on November 10, 2010.

References

External links
 Official Website
 FCC Public Inspection File for KYEC
 

YEC
Radio stations established in 2010
2010 establishments in Missouri
Hot adult contemporary radio stations in the United States
Ripley County, Missouri